Peter Magubane (born 18 January 1932) is a South African photographer.

Early life
Peter Sexford Magubane was born in Vrededorp, now Pageview, a suburb of Johannesburg, and grew up in Sophiatown. He began taking photographs using a Kodak Brownie box camera as a schoolboy.

In 1954 he read a copy of Drum, a magazine known for its reporting of urban blacks and the effects of apartheid. "They were dealing with social issues that affected black people in South Africa. I wanted to be part of that magazine."

He started employment at Drum as a driver. After six months of odd jobs, he was given a photography assignment under the mentorship of Jürgen Schadeberg, the chief photographer. He borrowed a camera and covered the 1955 ANC convention. "I went back to the office with good results and never looked back."

Being on assignment in the early years was not easy, as he recalled: "We were not allowed to carry a camera in the open if the police were involved, so I often had to hide my camera to get the pictures I wanted. On occasion I hid my camera in a hollowed-out Bible, firing with a cable release in my pocket. At another time, at a trial in Zeerust from which the press were banned, I hid my Leica 3G in a hollowed-out loaf of bread and pretended to eat while I was actually shooting pictures; when the bread went down, I bought milk and hid the camera in the carton. And I got away with it. You had to think fast and be fast to survive in those days."

Magubane photographed most of South Africa's historic moments, such as Sharpeville in 1960 and also Mandela's Rivonia trial in 1964. He later recalled: "I had never seen so many dead people." His editor wanted to know why he had not taken any close-ups. Magubane then "decided I was not going to get emotionally involved, or at least not until after I have done my work."

Middle and later years
He left Drum to become a freelancer. In 1967, he was employed by the Rand Daily Mail. In 1969, he was sent to photograph a demonstration outside Winnie Mandela's jail cell. He was arrested, interrogated and then put in solitary confinement. The charges were dropped in 1970. However, Magubane was banned from photography for five years. In 1971 he was imprisoned again and spent 98 days in solitary confinement and then spent six months in jail.

Following his release, Mugabane was assigned to cover the Soweto riots which occurred from June through to August 1976. He was arrested, beaten up and had his nose broken. Eventually, he was released at the end of 1976. The series of pictures he took brought him international recognition and acclaim. In February 1977, he would win an excellence in journalism award, sponsored by Stellenbosch Farmers' Winery and presented by Walter Cronkite.

This led to other opportunities. He worked on assignments for Time magazine, the United Nations and for Sports Illustrated photographing a series about the South African teenage runner Zola Budd. 

In 1985, Magubane spent time in hospital recovering from buckshot wounds received when he was caught in police crossfire at a funeral near Johannesburg.

In 2006, the South African Post Office issued a miniature sheet, commemorative envelope and a special canceller on National Women's Day. This commemorates the march on 9 August 1956 when 20,000 women from all parts of South Africa staged a second march on the Union Buildings to protest against the pass laws. They left petitions containing more than 100,000 signatures at the Prime Minister's door. The photograph used on the miniature sheet was taken by Peter Magubane during the march and features some of the women who led the 1956 march: Lilian Ngoyi, Helen Joseph, Sophia Williams-De Bruyn and Rahima Moosa.

Magubane has ceased working in photojournalism and now concentrates on art photography. He is documenting the surviving tribal ways in post-apartheid South Africa in colour. These photographs have been published under the African Heritage Series banner.

Books
 Black As I Am, Zindzi Mandela and Peter Magubane; foreword by Andrew Young, Los Angeles Guild of Tutors Press, 1978, 
 Magubane's South Africa; with a foreword by Ambassador Andrew Young, New York:  Alfred A. Knopf, distributed by Random House. 1978, 
 Soweto, photographed by Peter Magubane; text, Marshall Lee; contributing and picture editor, Dawn Lindberg, Cape Town: Don Nelson, 1978,  (2nd ed. 1983)
 Soweto Speaks, Jill Johnson, photographs by Peter Magubane, Johannesburg: A. D. Donker, 1979, 
 Black Child, New York: Alfred Knopf, 1982, 
 16 June: The Fruit of Fear, Braamfontein: Skotaville, 1986, 
 Soweto: The Fruit of Fear, Trenton, N.J.: Africa World Press, 1986,  (reissue of 16 June: The Fruit of Fear)
Soweto: Portrait of a City, photography by Peter Magubane; text by David Bristow, Stan Motjuwadi; [foreword by Archbishop Desmond Tutu]. London: New Holland, 1990  
Women of South Africa: their fight for freedom, photographs by Peter Magubane, text by Carol Lazar. Boston MA: Little, Brown & Co., 1993  
 Nelson Mandela, Man of Destiny: a pictorial biography, Cape Town: Don Nelson, 1996, 
 Vanishing Cultures of South Africa: changing customs in a changing world, Cape Town: Struik, 1998,  (The Xhosa—The Zulu—The Ndebele—The Venda—The Tsonga—The Basotho—The Tswana—The Pedi—The Ntwana—The San)
 African Renaissance, Cape Town: Struik, 2000, 
 African Heritage Series:
 Homesteads, Peter Magubane, text by Sandra Klopper, Cape Town: Struik, 2001, 
 Dress and Adornment, Peter Magubane, text by Sandra Klopper, 2001, 
 Ceremonies, Peter Magubane, text by Sandra Klopper, Cape Town: Struik. 2001, 
 Soweto, Peter Magubane and Charlene Smith, Cape Town: Struik, 2001, 
 African Heritage Series:
 Arts and Crafts, Peter Magubane, text by Sandra Klopper, Cape Town: Struik, 2001, 
 The BaNtwane: Africa's Undiscovered People, Peter Magubane, text by Sandra Klopper, Cape Town: Struik, 2001, 
 AmaNdebele, Peter Magubane, text by Sandra Klopper, Sunbird, 2005,

Film and video

 Peter Magubane appears as himself in the 1998 documentary Dying to Tell the Story.
 BBC Millennium diaries – Peter Magubane Photographer. "Having recorded the turbulent events in South Africa over the past 45 years on camera he tells of the journey to his homeland of today".

Exhibitions

Solo exhibitions
1985 — Photographic Gallery Hippolyte, Helsinki, Finland.
2005 — Madiba: Man of Destiny, Standard Bank Gallery, Johannesburg

Group exhibitions
 2001 – Soweto – A South African Myth – Photographs from the 1950s (by Alf Khumalo, Ernest Cole and Jürgen Schadeberg). The core of the exhibition is the student uprising of 1976. This includes some of Peter Magubane's work.
 2012–2013 – Rise and Fall of Apartheid: Photography and the Bureaucracy of Everyday Life

Awards

 1958 – First black South African to win a photographic prize in the country – first and third prizes were awarded to him for Best Press pictures of the year.
 1985 – Robert Capa Gold Medal
 1986 – Dr. Erich Salomon Award
 1992 – Special Missouri Honor Medal for Distinguished Service in Journalism 
 1995 – Martin Luther King Luthuli Award
 1997 – Lifetime Achievement Award from the Mother Jones Foundation and Leica Cameras
 1997 – Fellowship by the Tom Hopkinson School of Journalism and Cultural Studies, University of Wales, Cardiff 
 1999 – Order for Meritorious Service Class II from President Mandela
 2003 – Honorary doctorate degree from the University of South Africa
 2006 – Honorary doctorate of Philosophy Fort Hare University<ref name=WW>"Peter Magubane", Who's Who Southern Africa.</ref>
 2006 – Honorary doctorate of Technology Tshwane University of Technology
 2006 – Doctor of Law (honoris causa) Rhodes University
 2008 – Honorary Fellowship from the Royal Photographic Society, UK
 2010 – Cornell Capa Infinity Award from the International Center of Photography
 2010 – Honorary doctorate degree from Columbia College (Chicago)
 2015 - Nat Nakasa Award for Media Integrity

References

External links
Publications by or about Peter Magubane. Copac.
 "Peter Magubane Timeline 1932-", South African History Online, 12 February 2016.
 Sian Cain, "Peter Magubane's best photograph: a girl and her maid on a 'Europeans only' bench", The Guardian,  12 November 2015.
 Kerri MacDonald, "A Fighter With a Camera in Apartheid-Era South Africa", The New York Times'', 21 September 2012.

1932 births
Living people
South African photographers